Ugo Ceseri (30 June 1893 – 3 December 1940) was an Italian stage and film actor. He appeared in forty two films between 1931 and his death in 1940. In 1934 he appeared in the play 18 BL, an attempt to create a mass theatre by the Fascist government of Italy. The play was directed by Alessandro Blasetti and featured 2,000 amateur actors.

Selected filmography

 Figaro and His Great Day (1931)
 Palio (1931)
 The Opera Singer (1932)
 One Night with You (1932)
 Model Wanted (1933)
 The Haller Case (1933)
 Seconda B (1934)
 The Old Guard (1934)
 Unripe Fruit (1934)
 Just Married (1934)
 Red Passport (1935)
 Ginevra degli Almieri (1935)
 Aldebaran (1935)
Music in the Square (1936)
 The Dance of Time (1936)
 But It's Nothing Serious (1936)
 The Two Sergeants (1936)
 The Countess of Parma (1936)
 The Carnival Is Here Again (1937)
 The Castiglioni Brothers (1937)
 The Count of Brechard (1938)
 The Cuckoo Clock (1938)
 Backstage (1939)
 Father For a Night (1939)
 Un'avventura di Salvator Rosa (1940)

References

Bibliography
 Balfour, Michael. Theatre and War, 1933-1945: Performance in Extremis. Berghahn Books, 2001.

External links

1893 births
1940 deaths
Italian male film actors
Italian male stage actors
Actors from Florence
20th-century Italian male actors